Mrs. Gould's sunbird (Aethopyga gouldiae) is a sunbird species native to forests and shrublands from the southern foothills of the Himalayas to Southeast Asia.

Taxonomy 
Mrs.Gould's sunbird was first described by Irish zoologist Nicholas Vigors in 1831 and named after British bird artist Elizabeth Gould.

Four subspecies have been described:

 A. g. annamensis (Robinson & Kloss, 1919)
 A. g. dabryii (J.Verreaux, 1867)
 A. g. gouldiae (Vigors, 1831) (the nominate subspecies)
 A. g. isolata (E.C.S.Baker, 1925)

The species is regarded as closely related to the green-tailed sunbird.

Description
Mrs.Gould sunbird is a small sunbird. It has a down-curved and pointed beak, typical for a nectar feeder. The iris of the eye is usually deep brown, and the tarsus is black.

The male Mrs.Gould's sunbird is bright and colourful. The forehead to crown, supercilium and throat of the sunbird is deep violet. The lore, the auriculars and the malar region, the nape, mantle and side is bright red to deep scarlet. Bright blue patterns may present on the auricular and the side. The coverts and wingbars to the primary feathers are brown or olive green. The belly and vent are yellowish-green. The covert tail covert is blight blue and fades to dark purple at the tip of the tail.

The female is dull in colour compared to the male. The female is cover by deep olive green on the dorsal side and the greyish-yellow on the ventral side.

The colour and pattern may differential in different subspecies. For example, the breast of A. g. dabryii is purely scarlet, and A. g. gouldiae has a bright yellow breast, with or without a red stripe. 

The male weighs 4-12 g and measures 131-160 mm. Wing length is 51-58 mm, tail length is 64-88mm, and the tarsus is 13-15.5 mm in length. The female weighs 5-8 g and is between 91-111 mm in length. The wing is 45-54. The tail is 30.5-40 mm in length, and the tarsus is 12-16 mm in length. Both sexes have a beak 13-17 mm in length.

Distribution and habitat 
Mrs. Gould's sunbird is widely distributed in Bangladesh, Bhutan, Laos, Myanmar, Nepal, Thailand, India, Vietnam and Southern China. It is found in the evergreen broad-leaved forest, monsoon forest and deciduous broad-leaved forest at 1000-3500 m above sea-level. It is also occasionally found in orchards and bamboo forest within its range. There is a non-breeding population in Hong Kong..=

Ecology

Diet 
As a typical sunbird, Mrs. Gould's sunbird feeds on nectar. The elongated and tubular tongue is modified for sucking the nectar for tube-shape flowers. It also takes small invertebrates. Diet in Sichuan and Yunnan was found to include spiders, small beetles and hemipteran nymphs.

Behaviour 
Mrs. Gould's sunbird is generally resident but may undertake small-scale seasonal migrations. It is usually seen solitary or in pairs although temporary groups of 3-5 or even more than 10 individuals can form. It moves quickly and flies for short distances. Calls include a high thin "tzeeee" and sharp "tzit".

Reproduction 
The breeding period of Mrs. Gould's sunbird is April to June. Females nest around mid-April. The nest is built of moss, grass, plant fibers and spiderwebs. It is 15-18 cm long and 10-11.5 cm wide, and usually built in deciduous board-leaved forest at 1000-3000m above sea level. In the breeding season, the males court the females sunbird with a mating call 'zhai-zhai-zhai'. Clutch size is 2-3 eggs, 13.5-15.3 mm x 10.5-11.5 mm in size. The eggs are white and usually have reddish brown spots. Incubation lasts for about 2 weeks, and chicks fledge after 15-16 days. In this period, both parents care for the chicks. The adults feed nectar to the young chicks by regurgitation at the beginning; later on invertebrates are increasingly provided.

Conservation 

The species is listed as Least Concern in the IUCN Red List.

Mrs. Gould's sunbird is not on the list of endangered and protected species of China. However, it is on the List of Wild Animal that Protected by PRC with Beneficial and High Value of Economy and Science.

References

Mrs. Gould's sunbird
Birds of North India
Birds of Nepal
Birds of Eastern Himalaya
Birds of Tibet
Birds of Central China
Birds of Yunnan
Birds of Myanmar
Birds of Laos
Birds of Vietnam
Mrs. Gould's sunbird
Taxonomy articles created by Polbot